Joseph Boyd (1835 – July 15, 1898) was a blacksmith and political figure in Newfoundland. He represented Trinity Bay in the Newfoundland and Labrador House of Assembly from 1882 to 1885 as a Liberal.

He was born in St. John's. Boyd later served as sergeant-at-arms for the House of Assembly and then, in the 1890s, was named superintendent of the St. John's Poor Asylum. He died in Carbonear in 1898.

References 
 

Members of the Newfoundland and Labrador House of Assembly
1835 births
1925 deaths
Newfoundland Colony people